The 1995–96 Croatian Ice Hockey League season was the fifth season of the Croatian Ice Hockey League, the top level of ice hockey in Croatia. Four teams participated in the league, and Zagreb have won the championship.

Regular season

Playoffs

3rd place 
 KHL Medveščak Zagreb – INA Sisak 2:0 (16:4, 11:3)

Final
 KHL Mladost Zagreb – KHL Zagreb 0:3 (1:4, 2:6, 2:6)

External links 
 Season on hockeyarchives.info

Croatian Ice Hockey League
1v
Croatian Ice Hockey League seasons